Friday Night at St. Andrews (originally named Live from St. Andrews) is the third solo studio album by American rapper Bizarre. It was released on May 18, 2010 through AVJ Records. Production was handled by several record producers, including Bus & Napoleon, Honorable C.N.O.T.E., Silent Riot, J. Wells and WLPWR. It features guest appearances from King Gordy, Monica Braire, Anamul House, Big Dame, Bonecrusher, Fiona Simone, K.B., Kid Jinx, Kuniva, Lil' Will, MJ Robinson, Nate Walka, Riodata, Royce Da 5'9", Seven the General, Tech N9NE and Yelawolf.  Music videos were released for the songs "Believer", "Rap's Finest" and "Down This Road".

Background
Bizarre stated that his third album release would not be like his two previous albums, as it would focus less on humour and more on lyrical ability. He decided this because many people looked at Bizarre as not being a serious emcee and the fact that D12 continued to make comical music after the death of group member, Proof. Bizarre stated that production for the album would be done by lesser known, Detroit-based producers.

Title meaning
The meaning behind the title name "Friday Night at St. Andrews" has a significance in what Bizarre is trying to do with this album. Bizarre described the area of St. Andrews as once being a place where only "weirdos" would go to see hip hop acts on Friday nights.

St. Andrews now has a reputation as one of Detroit's biggest mainstays for live music in general. Bizarre states that's he is on a mission to undergo a similar transformation with this album.

Reception

Reviews for the album have been mainly negative. Luke Gibson of HipHopDX gave the album 1 and a half out of 5 stars and wrote that "While Bizarre is a grizzled veteran and strange has a market to sell, it has to be done in a convincing manner. Bizarre is unable to do this on Friday Night at St. Andrews, and even though the album is blessed with solid production, it is ultimately a failure".

A song on the album which was generally targeted by many reviewers was the song "I Love The Babies" for the fact that the song makes fun of pedophilia. HipHopDX wrote that "Over the course of the album, he talks about taking every drug known to man, sexing plenty of women - and on “I Love The Babies”, it's, well, just disturbing. The Detroit native understands that humor is part of his draw and like any controversial comedian, he pushes the limits. Unfortunately pedophilia is one of those unaccepted areas of humor, and listeners are left feeling uncomfortable".

Track listing

Personnel

Rufus Johnson – primary artist, producer, executive producer
Waverly Walter Alford III – featured artist (tracks: 11, 12, 15)
Blaire White – featured artist (tracks: 17, 19)
Shaphan "Maestro" Williams – featured artist (track 14), producer
Shabazz Ford – featured artist (track 3)
Willie J. Ray III – featured artist (track 4)
Kevin Brown – featured artist (track 5)
Fiona Simone – featured artist (track 5)
Von Carlisle – featured artist (track 6)
Ryan Daniel Montgomery – featured artist (track 6)
Burke "Seven The General" Bardwell – featured artist (track 6)
Mario Butterfield – featured artist (track 7)
Kid Jinx – featured artist (track 7)
Michael Wayne Atha – featured artist (track 9)
Aaron Dontez Yates – featured artist (track 10)
Nathan L. Walker – featured artist (track 10)
Denisha Matthews – featured artist (track 14)
Wayne Hardnett – featured artist (track 16)
"Jabba Jaw" Brian Mason – featured artist (track 16)
Derek "Scramn" Golsby – featured artist (track 16)
Damien Pittman – featured artist (track 18)
M.J. Robinson – featured artist (track 18)
Ahmed Oliver – producer
Yves "Bus The Producer" Bazelais Jr. - producer
Calvo Da Gr8 – producer
Carlton Davis Mays, Jr. – producer
DJ Cutmaster Swiff – producer
Jon Wells – producer
Napoleon Jerry Pierre - producer
Nick Kage – producer
Panama – producer
Vance Hornbuckle – producer, engineering
Walt Q-Sick – producer, mixing
Dewitt "Witt" Moore - producer
William Washington – producer
Shannon "Fat Shan" Houchins – executive producer
Jason "Boogie" Brown – executive producer, A&R
John "Blue" Allen – engineering, A&R coordinator
Mike Morris – guitar (track 12)
Juan Garcia – bass
Preston "P Groover" Crump – bass
Omar Philips – percussion
Tim "Herb" Alexander – programming
I.V. Duncan – engineering, mixing
Kevin Parker – engineering
Londell "Diszazta" Williamson – engineering
Ronald "Caveman" Rosario – engineering
Jeff Tomei – mixing
Josh Butler – mixing
Randall "RBL" Lumpkin – mastering, mixing
A. Alexander – composer
Rob Petrozzo – creative director
Diwang Valdez – photography
Tresa Sanders – publicity
Jason Wagner – media consultant

References

2010 albums
Bizarre (rapper) albums
Albums produced by WLPWR
Average Joes Entertainment albums
Albums produced by Honorable C.N.O.T.E.